Arthur L. Gravel (4 July 1904 – 7 March 1984) was a Canadian skier. He competed in the Nordic combined event at the 1932 Winter Olympics.

References

External links
 

1905 births
1984 deaths
Canadian male Nordic combined skiers
Olympic Nordic combined skiers of Canada
Nordic combined skiers at the 1932 Winter Olympics
Skiers from Montreal